Darnell Kennedy (born October 8, 1976) is a former arena / indoor football quarterback. Kennedy played for the Georgia Force of the Arena Football League. He is also a former Canadian Football League quarterback; he was a backup quarterback for the Toronto Argonauts, the Calgary Stampeders, and the Ottawa Renegades.

Kennedy played college football for Alabama State University from 1997 to 2001, and played in 2008 for the Huntington Heroes, an indoor football team in the American Indoor Football Association.

References

External links
 Georgia Force profile

1976 births
Living people
American football quarterbacks
American players of Canadian football
Canadian football quarterbacks
Alabama State Hornets football players
Calgary Stampeders players
Georgia Force players
Ottawa Renegades players
Toronto Argonauts players
South Georgia Wildcats players
Sportspeople from Mobile, Alabama
Players of American football from Atlanta
Players of American football from Alabama
Albany Panthers players
Alabama Hammers players
Huntington Heroes players